The Vereinsthaler was the currency of the Electorate of Hesse-Kassel (or Hesse-Cassel) between 1858 and 1873. It replaced the Thaler at par and was replaced by the German Mark at a rate of 1 Vereinsthaler = 3 Mark.

The Vereinsthaler was subdivided into 30 Silbergroschen, each of 12 Heller.

References

External links
 

Currencies of Germany
Modern obsolete currencies
1858 establishments in Germany
1873 disestablishments in Germany
1860s in Germany
19th-century economic history
Electorate of Hesse